Grace Thorp Gemberling (July 31, 1903 – December 26, 1997) was an American artist known for the broad range of her subjects in paintings having a pronounced psychological as well as aesthetic impact. One critic said they conveyed a mood that was "ethereal, bold and engaged." Another said her work showed "a disciplined hand and a romantic eye" together with "a magical color sense." Known for her control of detail and successful handling of line and blocks of color, she was said to paint in a modernist style that stayed clear of abstraction and was remembered by a teacher and fellow artist as "the finest woman painter in Philadelphia during the 20s and 30s."

Early life and training
Born in Philadelphia, Gemberling grew up in that city and at a farm her family owned in Selinsgrove, Pennsylvania. She developed an interest in art while a student at Friends' Central School. With the encouragement of her parents, she enrolled in the Pennsylvania Academy of Fine Arts in 1920 and for the next three years she studied under Daniel Garber, Hugh Breckenridge, and Arthur Carles. Showing great promise as a student, she received the valuable Cresson Traveling Scholarship in both 1923 and 1924.

Career

Gemberling's career as a professional artist began after she returned from European travel in 1924 and decided not to continue attending classes at the Pennsylvania Academy of Fine Arts. When in 1926 she exhibited with the Philadelphia Water Color Club, a reviewer said her painting, "Marine" was "gorgeous," and later that year when she exhibited at the Plastic Club, the same reviewer praised a portrait of hers, "Anna Ruth," as "nicely spontaneous." Thereafter, her paintings appeared frequently in Philadelphia exhibitions and quite often received favorable notice. From 1930 onwards, she showed in other East Coast locations including the Corcoran Biennials of 1930 and 1935 in Washington, D.C.; the Salons of America and National Association of Women Painters and Sculptors exhibitions of 1932 in New York; and exhibitions held by the North Shore Art Association of Gloucester, Massachusetts, in 1932 and 1933.

Artistic style

During the course of her career critics frequently noticed Gemberling's competent handling of color and her skill in design and execution.
 
Critics singled out specific paintings for discussion. Regarding "Otakar Sevcik" C. H. Bonte of The Philadelphia Inquirer wrote: "Her so called 'sketch' of Professor Otakar Sevcik (1852-1936) is a creation of so much life, charm and dignity of coloring as to constitute a finished portrait." Of her "Amusement Park" Edward Alden Jewell of The New York Times wrote: "Grace Thorp Gemberling's "Amusement Park" young ladies look quite as indisposed as ever. Those who pin their admiration exclusively to subject will doubtless turn away from protagonists so depressing, but the judicious can hardly fail to admire this painter's astuteness in constructing a picture."

In reviewing an untitled landscape Scott Chalfont wrote in an exhibition catalog: "So characteristic of Gemberling's finest talent, in this landscape she takes a scene and makes it her own. From the wispy trees, to the dark skies and vibrant houses, the contrasts create a compelling painting." In 1938 a critic wrote:

As personal as are the creations of Grace Gemberling, there is extraordinary variety in her canvasses. The artist's delineation of well-worn houses is unique as her interpretation of them in color, and there is nothing we like more than the simple but fruitful wedding of line and color mass. Control of detail is, in this case, an additional gift. Canvases may be flooded with subsidiary graphic or pigmental themes, but there is never confusion. Grace Gemberling is one of Philadelphia's most promising painters.
 

Concerning the painting "Colonial Stairway" Chalfont wrote: "One of the more realistically interpreted compositions by Gemberling, this is clearly the "Montmorenci" Stair Hall at Winterthur Museum. Wonder- fully rendered, this painting invites the viewer into the opulence of the interior and demonstrates her deep ap- preciation for the Winterthur Museum and the impressive collection within."

Exhibitions and awards

The exhibitions in which Gemberling participated were mostly non-commercial. The two organizations that showed her work more than any others were both ones where she had been a student: She contributed paintings, watercolors, and drawings to nearly all the annual exhibitions held by the Pennsylvania Academy of Fine Arts between 1927 and 1943 and to many of the annual exhibitions held at Friends' Central School between 1934 and 1955. Other non-commercial organizations that showed her work on multiple occasions included the Plastic Club of Philadelphia, the Corcoran Gallery of Art, the North Shore Art Association, and the National Association of Women Painters and Sculptors. Non-commercial organizations that showed her a single time included the City Art Museum of St. Louis (1930), Salons of America (New York, 1932), Philadelphia Water Color Club (1926), National Academy of Design (New York, 1932), Whitney Museum of American Art (New York, 1934), Society of Independent Artists (New York, 1934), Studio House (Washington, D.C., 1936), Women's University Club (Philadelphia, 1938), Federal Art Project show at the Philadelphia Museum of Art (1938), and Everyman's Gallery (Art Alliance, Philadelphia, 1953).

Her relatively few exhibitions in private galleries included a solo exhibition at the Mellon Galleries in Philadelphia (1933), Gimbel Galleries in Philadelphia (1935) and group shows at the Boyer Gallery's two locations, Philadelphia, and New York (both in 1936). 

Gemberling was known for the number of important awards she had won. Most came from the Pennsylvania Academy of Fine Arts, which honored her twice with its highly valued student award, the Cresson Traveling Scholarship, in 1923 and 1924, and twice with its Fellowship Prize, given by members of the Academy to one of its own (1931, 1940). It also awarded her the Lambert Purchase Prize and the Mary Smith Prize for best painting by a Philadelphia woman artist, both in 1930, and a Gold Medal for her painting "Landscape." She also won the Oliver Beck Figure Composition Prize from the National Association of Women Painters and Sculptors in 1933.

Art teacher

During the 1930s Gemberling gave art instruction in her studio in Bala Cynwyd, Pennsylvania.  One of her students, Jane Piper, later became a well-known artist.

Personal life and family

Gemberling was born on July 31, 1903. Her parents were Joseph Burton Gemberling and Lulu Sarah Thorp Gemberling who married December 28, 1898, and whose home was in "Ivy Cottage," Bala Cynwyd, Pennsylvania.  Her father was born in Selinsgrove, Pennsylvania in 1867 and died in 1943.  He was a successful construction manager for a company that built bridges. Her mother was born in 1880.
Gemberling had an older sister named Josephine who performed in concert on the violin in the years prior to her marriage in 1927 to Donald Robb Cochran. The family spent summer vacations on the Gemberling farm in Selinsgrove. Gemberling was educated at Friends Central School in Philadelphia before enrolling in the Pennsylvania Academy of Fine Arts.

In the late 1930s Gemberling married a well known Philadelphia architect, W. R. Morton Keast, and remained married to him until his death. Keast had two daughters by a prior marriage. He and Gemberling had no children. Keast was the chief designer for the architectural firm run by John T. Windrim. In the 1920s and 1930s he designed a number of major buildings in Philadelphia including the Franklin Institute, the Municipal Court Building, the Wannamaker's Men's Store (now known as One South Broad, and the Fidelity Bank Building. He was born in Germantown in 1888 and died Bala Cynwyd in 1873.

From the late 1940s through the 1960s Gemberling was active in Philadelphia society. The great-granddaughter of a Revolutionary War veteran (Johann Jacob Gemberling), she joined and became leader (Regent) of the Thomas Leiper chapter of the Daughters of the American Revolution. She was also an active member of the Pennsylvania Chapter of the National Society of Daughters of Founders and Patriots of America, the National Society of the Colonial Dames of America, and the Pennsylvania Society of New England Women. Gemberling was an avid gardener and member of the Philadelphia Society of Little Gardens. She died on December 26, 1997, and was buried in the West Laurel Hill Cemetery, Bala Cynwyd.

Other names used

Gemberling's full name was Grace Thorp Gemberling. Thorp was her mother's maiden name; it is sometimes given as Thorpe. She commonly used Grace Gemberling prior to her marriage although sometimes she would use Grace T. Gemberling. The New York Times usually referred to her as Grace Thorp Gemberling. In addition to these name usages, following her marriage she was also called Grace Gemberling Keast, Grace Keast, Grace G. Keast, or Mrs. W. R. Morton Keast.

Further reading

Grace Thorpe Gemberling Keast; Sanely Modern; a Special Exhibition of One of Philadelphia's First and Finest Women Modernist Painters [exhibition catalog] by Scott Chalfant (2011, H. L. Chalfont)

Notes

References

1903 births
1997 deaths
Artists from Philadelphia
20th-century American painters
American women painters
American art educators
20th-century American women artists